Maharathi Karna is a Bollywood mythological film based on the life of Karna directed by Bhalji Pendharkar. It was released in 1944 under the banner of Prabhakar Pictures.

Cast
The cast of the film:
 Prithviraj Kapoor as Karna
 Durga Khote as Kunti
 Shahu Modak as Krishna
 K.N. Singh as Duryodhan
 Kamalakar Torne 
 Chandrakant as Arjun

Reception 
The film was cited as one of Kapoor's notable films by author Ashok Raj. The Indian Express, in their review of the film in 1945, praised the film as an "interesting biography" produced on "an elaborate scale", and commeded the performences by Khote and Kapoor.

References

External links
 

1944 films
1940s Hindi-language films
Films based on the Mahabharata
Indian action films
1940s action films
Indian black-and-white films